Panchpakhadi is a locality of Thane city of Maharashtra state in India. It is known for Kachrali lake, the head office of Thane Municipal Corporation, S.E.S. High School and Junior College, few temples and several food outlets.

Etymology
The word Panchpakhadi literally stands for five fields. The area originally consisted of five massive fields owned by various landlords. However, the current scenario depicts an urbanized area with dense residential complexes and commercial shops.

Location
It lies adjoining to Naupada area and the Teen Hath Naka, within walking distance from Thane railway station. It is one of the prime locations of Thane city. The head office of Thane Municipal Corporation (TMC) is next to Kachrali Lake.

Places
A Jain temple lies nearby. Also, a temple of Shiv and Parmarth Niketan, a Hindu temple-cum meditation place are located in this area. The Dynanraj Sabhagruha Hall & the Dnyaneshwar Maharaj temple lies nearby.

The area is popular for the renowned school of Thane, namely, S.E.S. High School and Junior College. It also has numerous outlets of food brands.

Kachrali Lake

"Kachrali Talao" is a picturesque lake with a small 'one tree island' on it. This lake has a circumference of 500m. It attracts many people for its jogging tracks, children play area, exercise area. There is a temple of Lord Ganesh inside the lake premises. Once a slum area, major cleansing & beautification has transformed it to a jogger's paradise. The government has brought Ducks on the lake, these ducks can be seen in the lake especially on the one tree island.

Events
Every year, the MLA Jitendra Awhad organizes Ganesh Chathurthi and Krishna Janmashtami celebrations, that are carried out in a pompous and grand manner. However, since 2015, the Krishna Janmashtami celebration has not been held.

Food Localities

The area has a lot of eateries and restaurants, most of them being located on the Gen. Arun Kumar Vaidya Road and Meenatai Thackeray Marg. Some of the popular eateries here are-
 Prashant Corner
 Fruitfrenzy icecream
 Domino's Pizza
 Shivsagar Hotel
 Krishna Sweets
 Ribbons & Balloons
 Monginis
 Durga Vihar
 Café Coffee Day
 Malwan Hotel
 Celebration Hotel
 Natural's Ice Cream
 Gelato Italiano
 Baskin-Robbins
 Thambi
 Santosh Vada Pav
 Wok Express

References 

Kopri Pachpakhadi Election 2009

External links
Thane Municipality Site 

Neighbourhoods in Thane
Tourist attractions in Thane